Shugoshin 2 (Shugoshin-2), also known as Shugoshin-like 2, is a protein which in humans is encoded by the SGO2 gene.

Function 
Shugoshin-2 is one of the two mammalian orthologs of the Shugoshin/Mei-S322 family of proteins that regulate sister chromatid cohesion by protecting the integrity of a multiprotein complex named cohesin. This protective system is essential for faithful chromosome segregation during mitosis and meiosis, which is the physical basis of Mendelian inheritance.

Model organisms
				
Model organisms have been used in the study of SGO2 function. A conditional knockout mouse line, called Sgol2tm1a(EUCOMM)Wtsi was generated as part of the International Knockout Mouse Consortium program — a high-throughput mutagenesis project to generate and distribute animal models of disease to interested scientists — at the Wellcome Trust Sanger Institute. Male and female animals underwent a standardized phenotypic screen to determine the effects of deletion. Twenty two tests were carried out on mutant mice but no significant abnormalities were observed.

Using another genetically engineered mouse that lacks Sgol2 function, and siRNA experiments in oocytes, it has been shown that disruption of the mouse SGOL2 does not cause any alteration in sister chromatid cohesion in embryonic cultured fibroblasts and adult somatic tissues.  Moreover, although these mutant mice also develop normally and survive to adulthood without any apparent alteration, both male and female Sgol2-deficient mice from this line are infertile. By different approaches it was demonstrated that SGOL2 is necessary for protecting centromeric cohesion during mammalian meiosis I. In vivo, the loss of SGOL2 promotes a premature release of the meiosis-specific REC8 cohesin complexes from anaphase I centromeres. This molecular alteration is manifested cytologically by the complete loss of centromere cohesion at metaphase II leading to single chromatids and physiologically with the formation of aneuploid gametes that give rise to infertility.

References

Further reading

Genes mutated in mice